Ashot Ter-Matevosyan is an Armenian actor. He is known for his roles in many Armenian TV-series airing on Shant TV, Armenia TV and Public Television company of Armenia. He works in Goy theater as an actor.

Filmography

See also 
 Sofya Poghosyan

References

External links 

Living people
Male actors from Yerevan
Armenian film actors
21st-century Armenian actors
Armenian Apostolic Christians
Year of birth missing (living people)